Catalonia is an autonomous community of Spain, designated as a nationality by its Statute of Autonomy.

Most of its territory (except the Val d'Aran) lies on the northeast of the Iberian Peninsula, to the south of the Pyrenees mountain range. Catalonia is administratively divided into four provinces: Barcelona, Girona, Lleida, and Tarragona. The capital and largest city, Barcelona, is the second-most populated municipality in Spain and the fifth-most populous urban area in the European Union. Current day Catalonia comprises most of the medieval and early modern Principality of Catalonia (with the remainder Roussillon now part of France's Pyrénées-Orientales). It is bordered by France (Occitanie) and Andorra to the north, the Mediterranean Sea to the east, and the Spanish autonomous communities of Aragon to the west and Valencia to the south. The official languages are Catalan, Spanish, and the Aranese dialect of Occitan.

In the late 8th century, various counties across the eastern Pyrenees were established by the Frankish kingdom as a defensive barrier against Muslim invasions. In the 10th century, the County of Barcelona became progressively independent. In 1137, Barcelona and the Kingdom of Aragon were united by marriage under the Crown of Aragon. Within the Crown, the Catalan counties adopted a common polity, the Principality of Catalonia, developing its institutional system, such as Courts, Generalitat and constitutions, becoming the base for the Crown's Mediterranean trade and expansionism. In the later Middle Ages, Catalan literature flourished. In 1469, the king of Aragon and the queen of Castile were married and ruled their realms together, retaining all of their distinct institutions and legislation.

During the Franco-Spanish War (1635–1659), Catalonia revolted (1640–1652) against a large and burdensome presence of the royal army, being briefly proclaimed a republic under French protection until it was largely reconquered by the Spanish army. By the Treaty of the Pyrenees (1659), the northern parts of Catalonia, mostly the Roussillon, were ceded to France. During the War of the Spanish Succession (1701–1714), the Crown of Aragon sided against the Bourbon Philip V of Spain, but the Catalans were defeated with the fall of Barcelona on 11 September 1714.  Philip V subsequently imposed a unifying administration across Spain, enacting the Nueva Planta decrees which, like in the other realms of the Crown of Aragon, suppressed the Catalan institutions and rights. As a consequence, Catalan as a language of government and literature was eclipsed by Spanish. Throughout the 18th century, Catalonia experienced economic growth.

In the 19th century, Catalonia was severely affected by the Napoleonic and Carlist Wars. In the second third of the century, it experienced industrialisation. As wealth from the industrial expansion grew, it saw a cultural renaissance coupled with incipient nationalism while several workers movements appeared. With the establishment of the Second Spanish Republic (1931–1939), the Generalitat was restored as a Catalan autonomous government. After the Spanish Civil War, the Francoist dictatorship enacted repressive measures, abolishing Catalan self-government and banning the official use of the Catalan language. After a period of autarky, from the late 1950s through to the 1970s Catalonia saw rapid economic growth, drawing many workers from across Spain, making Barcelona one of Europe's largest industrial metropolitan areas and turning Catalonia into a major tourist destination. During the Spanish transition to democracy (1975–1982), Catalonia regained self-government and is now one of the most economically dynamic communities in Spain.

Since the 2010s, there has been growing support for Catalan independence. On 27 October 2017, the Catalan Parliament unilaterally declared independence following a referendum that was deemed unconstitutional by the Spanish state. The Spanish Senate voted in favour of enforcing direct rule by removing the Catalan government and calling a snap regional election. The Spanish Supreme Court imprisoned seven former ministers of the Catalan government on charges of rebellion and misuse of public funds, while several others—including then-President Carles Puigdemont—fled to other European countries. Those in prison were pardoned by the Spanish government in 2021.

Etymology and pronunciation 
The name "Catalonia", spelled Cathalonia, began to be used for the homeland of the Catalans (Cathalanenses) in the late 11th century and was probably used before as a territorial reference to the group of counties that comprised part of the March of Gothia and the March of Hispania under the control of the Count of Barcelona and his relatives. The origin of the name Catalunya is subject to diverse interpretations because of a lack of evidence.

One theory suggests that Catalunya derives from the name Gothia (or Gauthia) Launia ("Land of the Goths"), since the origins of the Catalan counts, lords and people were found in the March of Gothia, known as Gothia, whence Gothland >  >  >  > Catalonia theoretically derived. During the Middle Ages, Byzantine chroniclers claimed that Catalania derives from the local medley of Goths with Alans, initially constituting a Goth-Alania.

Other theories suggest:

Catalunya derives from the term "land of castles", having evolved from the term castlà or castlan, the medieval term for a castellan (a ruler of a castle). This theory therefore suggests that the names Catalunya and Castile have a common root.
The source is the Celtic catalauni, meaning "chiefs of battle", similar to the Celtic given name *Katuwalos; although the area is not known to have been occupied by the Celtiberians, a Celtic culture was present within the interior of the Iberian Peninsula in pre-Roman times.
The Lacetani, an Iberian tribe that lived in the area and whose name, due to the Roman influence, could have evolved by metathesis to Katelans and then Catalans.
Miguel Vidal, finding serious shortcomings with earlier proposals (such as that an original -t- would have, by normal sound laws in the local Romance languages, developed into -d-), suggested an Arabic etymology:  – meaning "killer" – could have been applied by Muslims to groups of raiders and bandits on the southern border of the Marca Hispanica. The name, originally derogatory, could have been reappropriated by Christians as an autonym. This is comparable to attested development of the term Almogavar in nearby areas. In this model, the name Catalunya derives from the plural qattālūn while the adjective and language name català derives from the singular qattāl, both with the addition of common Romance suffixes.

In English, Catalonia is pronounced . The native name, Catalunya, is pronounced  in Central Catalan, the most widely spoken variety, whose pronunciation is considered standard. The Spanish name is Cataluña, and the Aranese name is Catalonha.

History

Prehistory 

The first known human settlements in what is now Catalonia were at the beginning of the Middle Paleolithic. The oldest known trace of human occupation is a mandible found in Banyoles, described by some sources as pre-Neanderthal, that is, some 200,000 years old; other sources suggest it to be only about one third that old. From the next prehistoric era, the Epipalaeolithic or Mesolithic, important remains survive, the greater part dated between 8000 and 5000 BC, such as those of Sant Gregori (Falset) and el Filador (Margalef de Montsant). The most important sites from these eras, all excavated in the region of Moianès, are the Balma del Gai (Epipaleolithic) and the Balma de l'Espluga (late Epipaleolithic and Early Neolithic).

The Neolithic era began in Catalonia around 5000BC, although the population was slower to develop fixed settlements than in other places, thanks to the abundance of woods, which allowed the continuation of a fundamentally hunter-gatherer culture. An example of such settlements would be La Draga at Banyoles, an "early Neolithic village which dates from the end of the 6th millenniumBC."

The Chalcolithic period developed in Catalonia between 2500 and 1800BC, with the beginning of the construction of copper objects. The Bronze Age occurred between 1800 and 700BC. There are few remnants of this era, but there were some known settlements in the low Segre zone. The Bronze Age coincided with the arrival of the Indo-Europeans through the Urnfield Culture, whose successive waves of migration began around 1200BC, and they were responsible for the creation of the first proto-urban settlements. Around the middle of the 7th centuryBC, the Iron Age arrived in Catalonia.

Pre-Roman and Roman period 

In pre-Roman times, the area that is now called Catalonia in the north-east of Iberian Peninsula – like the rest of the Mediterranean side of the peninsula – was populated by the Iberians. The Iberians of this area – the Ilergetes, Indigetes and Lacetani (Cerretains) – also maintained relations with the peoples of the Mediterranean. Some urban agglomerations became relevant, including Ilerda (Lleida) inland, Hibera (perhaps Amposta or Tortosa) or Indika (Ullastret). Coastal trading colonies were established by the ancient Greeks, who settled around the Gulf of Roses, in Emporion (Empúries) and Roses in the 8th century BC. The Carthaginians briefly ruled the territory in the course of the Second Punic War and traded with the surrounding Iberian population.

After the Carthaginian defeat by the Roman Republic, the north-east of Iberia became the first to come under Roman rule and became part of Hispania, the westernmost part of the Roman Empire. Tarraco (modern Tarragona) was one of the most important Roman cities in Hispania and the capital of the province of Tarraconensis. Other important cities of the Roman period are Ilerda (Lleida), Dertosa (Tortosa), Gerunda (Girona) as well as the ports of Empuriæ (former Emporion) and Barcino (Barcelona). As for the rest of Hispania, Latin law was granted to all cities under the reign of Vespasian (69–79AD), while Roman citizenship was granted to all free men of the empire by the Edict of Caracalla in 212AD (Tarraco, the capital, was already a colony of Roman law since 45BC). It was a rich agricultural province (olive oil, wine, wheat), and the first centuries of the Empire saw the construction of roads (the most important being the Via Augusta, parallel to Mediterranean coastline) and infrastructure like aqueducts.

Conversion to Christianity, attested in the 3rdcentury, was completed in urban areas in the 4thcentury. Although Hispania remained under Roman rule and did not fall under the rule of Vandals, Suebi and Alans in the 5thcentury, the main cities suffered frequent sacking and some deurbanization.

Middle Ages 

After the fall of the Western Roman Empire, the area was conquered by the Visigoths and was ruled as part of the Visigothic Kingdom for almost two and a half centuries. In 718, it came under Muslim control and became part of Al-Andalus, a province of the Umayyad Caliphate. From the conquest of Roussillon in 760, to the conquest of Barcelona in 801, the Frankish empire took control of the area between Septimania and the Llobregat river from the Muslims and created heavily militarised, self-governing counties. These counties formed part of the historiographically known as the Gothic and Hispanic Marches, a buffer zone in the south of the Frankish empire in the former province of Septimania and in the northeast of the Iberian Peninsula, to act as a defensive barrier for the Frankish Empire against further Muslim invasions from Al-Andalus.

These counties came under the rule of the counts of Barcelona, who were Frankish vassals nominated by the emperor of the Franks, to whom they were feudatories (801–988). The earliest known use of the name "Catalonia" for these counties dates to 1117. At the end of the 9thcentury, the Count of Barcelona Wilfred the Hairy (878–897) made his titles hereditaries and thus founded the dynasty of the House of Barcelona, which ruled Catalonia until 1410.

In 988 Borrell II, Count of Barcelona, did not recognise the new French king Hugh Capet as his king, evidencing the loss of dependency from Frankish rule and confirming his successors (from Ramon Borrell I onwards) as independent of the Capetian crown whom they regarded as usurpers of the Carolingian Frankish realm. At the beginning of eleventh century the Catalan counties suffered an important process of feudalisation, partially controlled by the efforts of church's sponsored Peace and Truce Assemblies and the negotiation skills of the Count of Barcelona Ramon Berenguer I (1035–1076), which began the codification of feudal law in the written Usages of Barcelona, becoming the basis of the Catalan law. In 1137, Ramon Berenguer IV, Count of Barcelona decided to accept King Ramiro II of Aragon's proposal to marry Queen Petronila, establishing the dynastic union of the County of Barcelona with the Kingdom of Aragon, creating the composite monarchy known as the Crown of Aragon and making the Catalan counties that were united under the County of Barcelona into a principality of the Aragonese Crown.

In 1258, by means of the Treaty of Corbeil, James I of Aragon King of Aragon and Count of Barcelona, king of Mallorca and of Valencia, renounced his family rights and dominions in Occitania and recognised the king of France as heir of the Carolingian Dynasty. The king of France, Louis IX, formally relinquished his claims of feudal lordship over all the Catalan counties, except the County of Foix, despite the opposition of king James. This treaty confirmed, from French point of view, the independence of the Catalan counties established and exercised during the previous three centuries, but also meant the irremediable separation between the geographical areas of Catalonia and Languedoc.

As a coastal territory, Catalonia became the base of the Aragonese Crown's maritime forces, which spread the power of the Crown in the Mediterranean, turning Barcelona into a powerful and wealthy city. In the period of 1164–1410, new territories, the Kingdom of Valencia, the Kingdom of Majorca, the Kingdom of Sardinia, the Kingdom of Sicily, and, briefly, the Duchies of Athens and Neopatras, were incorporated into the dynastic domains of the House of Aragon. The expansion was accompanied by a great development of the Catalan trade, creating an extensive trade network across the Mediterranean which competed with those of the maritime republics of Genoa and Venice.

At the same time, the Principality of Catalonia developed a complex institutional and political system based in the concept of a pact between the estates of the realm and the king. Laws had to be approved in the Catalan Courts (Corts Catalanes), one of the first parliamentary bodies of Europe that, since 1283, obtained the power to create legislation with the monarch. The Courts were composed of the three Estates organized into "arms" (braços), were presided over by the monarch, and approved the Catalan constitutions, which established a compilation of rights for the inhabitants of the Principality. In order to collect general taxes, the Courts of 1359 established a permanent representative of deputies position, called the Deputation of the General (and later usually known as Generalitat), which gained considerable political power over the next centuries.

The domains of the Aragonese Crown were severely affected by the Black Death pandemic and by later outbreaks of the plague. Between 1347 and 1497 Catalonia lost 37percent of its population. In 1410, the last reigning monarch of the House of Barcelona, King Martin I died without surviving descendants. Under the Compromise of Caspe (1412), Ferdinand from the Castilian House of Trastámara received the Crown of Aragon as Ferdinand I of Aragon. During the reign of his son, John II, social and political tensions caused the Catalan Civil War (1462–1472) and the War of the Remences (1462-1486). The Sentencia Arbitral de Guadalupe (1486) liberated the remença peasants from the feudal evil customs.

In the later Middle Ages, Catalan literature flourished in Catalonia proper and in the kingdoms of Majorca and Valencia, with such remarkable authors as the philosopher Ramon Llull, the Valencian poet Ausiàs March, and Joanot Martorell, author of the novel Tirant lo Blanch, published in 1490.

Modern era 

Ferdinand II of Aragon, the grandson of Ferdinand I, and Queen Isabella I of Castile were married in 1469, later taking the title the Catholic Monarchs; subsequently, this event was seen by historiographers as the dawn of a unified Spain. At this time, though united by marriage, the Crowns of Castile and Aragon maintained distinct territories, each keeping its own traditional institutions, parliaments, laws and currency. Castile commissioned expeditions to the Americas and benefited from the riches acquired in the Spanish colonisation of the Americas, but, in time, also carried the main burden of military expenses of the united Spanish kingdoms. After Isabella's death, Ferdinand II personally ruled both crowns.

By virtue of descent from his maternal grandparents, Ferdinand II of Aragon and Isabella I of Castile, in 1516 Charles I of Spain became the first king to rule the Crowns of Castile and Aragon simultaneously by his own right. Following the death of his paternal (House of Habsburg) grandfather, Maximilian I, Holy Roman Emperor, he was also elected Charles V, Holy Roman Emperor, in 1519.

Over the next few centuries, the Principality of Catalonia was generally on the losing side of a series of wars that led steadily to an increased centralization of power in Spain. Despite this fact, between the 16th and 18th centuries, the participation of the political community in the local and the general Catalan government grew (thus consolidating its constitutional system), while the kings remained absent, represented by a viceroy. Tensions between Catalan institutions and the Monarchy began to arise. The large and burdensome presence of the Spanish royal army in the Principality due to the Franco-Spanish War led to an uprising of peasants, provoking the Reapers' War (1640–1652), which saw Catalonia rebel (briefly as a republic led by the chairman of the Generalitat, Pau Claris) with French help against the Spanish Crown for overstepping Catalonia's rights during the Thirty Years' War. Within a brief period France took full control of Catalonia. Most of Catalonia was reconquered by the Spanish Monarchy but Catalan rights were recognised. Roussillon and half of Cerdanya was lost to France by the Treaty of the Pyrenees (1659).

The most significant conflict concerning the governing monarchy was the War of the Spanish Succession (1701–1715), which began when the childless Charles II of Spain, the last Spanish Habsburg, died without an heir in 1700. Charles II had chosen Philip V of Spain from the French House of Bourbon. Catalonia, like other territories that formed the Crown of Aragon, rose up in support of the Austrian Habsburg pretender Charles VI, Holy Roman Emperor, in his claim for the Spanish throne as Charles III of Spain. The fight between the houses of Bourbon and Habsburg for the Spanish Crown split Spain and Europe.

The fall of Barcelona on 11 September 1714 to the Bourbon king Philip V militarily ended the Habsburg claim to the Spanish Crown, which became legal fact in the Treaty of Utrecht. Philip felt that he had been betrayed by the Catalan Courts, as it had initially sworn its loyalty to him when he had presided over it in 1701. In retaliation for the betrayal, and inspired by the French absolutist style of government, the first Bourbon king introduced the Nueva Planta decrees, that incorporated the realms of the Crown of Aragon, including the Principality of Catalonia, as province of the Crown of Castile in 1716, terminating their separate institutions, laws and rights, as well as their  politics, within a united kingdom of Spain. From the second third of 18th century onwards Catalonia carried out a successful process of proto-industrialization, reinforced in the late quarter of the century when Castile's trade monopoly with American colonies ended.

The beginning of the Spanish nation state 
After the War of the Spanish Succession, the assimilation of the Crown of Aragon by the Castilian Crown through the Nueva Planta Decrees, was the first step in the creation of the Spanish nation state. And like other European nation-states in formation, it was not on a uniform ethnic basis, but by imposing the political and cultural characteristics of the capital, in this case Madrid and Central Spain, on those of the other areas, whose inhabitants would become national minorities to be assimilated through nationalist policies. These nationalist policies, sometimes very aggressive, and still in force, have been and are the seed of repeated territorial conflicts within the state.

Late modern history 

At the beginning of the nineteenth century, Catalonia was severely affected by the Napoleonic Wars. In 1808, it was occupied by French troops; the resistance against the occupation eventually developed into the Peninsular War. The rejection to French dominion was institutionalized with the creation of "juntas" (councils) who, remaining loyal to the Bourbons, exercised the sovereignty and representation of the territory due to the disappearance of the old institutions. Napoleon took direct control of Catalonia to reestablish order, creating the Government of Catalonia under the rule of Marshall Augereau, and making Catalan briefly an official language again. Between 1812 and 1814, Catalonia was annexed to France and organized as four departments. The French troops evacuated Catalan territory at the end of 1814. After the Bourbon restoration in Spain and the death of the absolutist king Ferdinand VII (1833), Carlist Wars erupted against the newly established liberal state of Isabella II. Catalonia was divided, with the coastal and most industrialized areas supporting liberalism, while many inland areas were in the hands of the Carlist faction, as the latter proposed to reestablish the institutional systems suppressed by the Nueva Planta decrees in the ancient realms of the Crown of Aragon. The consolidation of the liberal state saw a new territorial division of Spain into provinces, including Catalonia, which was divided into four (Barcelona, Girona, Lleida and Tarragona).

In the second third of the 19thcentury, Catalonia became an important industrial center, particularly focused on textiles. This process was a consequence of the conditions of proto-industrialization of the prior two centuries in the area and boosted by, among other factors, national , although the policy of the Spanish government during those times oscillated between free trade and protectionism. Along the century, textile industry flourished in urban areas and in the countryside, usually in the form of company towns. To this day it remains one of the most industrialised areas of Spain. In 1832, the Bonaplata Factory in Barcelona became the first in the country to make use of the steam engine. The first railway on the Iberian Peninsula was built between Barcelona and Mataró in 1848.

During those decades, Barcelona was the focus of important revolutionary uprisings known as "bullangues", causing a conflictive relation between many sectors of Catalan society and the central government and, in Catalonia, a republican current began to develop; also, inevitably, many Catalans favored the federalization of Spain. Meanwhile, the Catalan language saw a cultural renaissance from the second third of the century onwards, the Renaixença, among both the working class and the bourgeoisie. Right after the fall of the First Spanish Republic (1873–1874) and the subsequent restoration of the Bourbon dynasty (1874), Catalan nationalism began to be organized politically under the leadership of the republican federalist Valentí Almirall.

The anarchist movement had been active throughout the last quarter of the 19th century and the early 20th century, founding the CNT trade union in 1910 and achieving one of the first eight-hour workday in Europe in 1919. Growing resentment of conscription and of the military culminated in the Tragic Week in Barcelona in 1909. Under the hegemony of the Regionalist League, Catalonia gained a degree of administrative unity for the first time in the Modern era. In 1914, the four Catalan provinces were authorized to create a commonwealth (Catalan: Mancomunitat de Catalunya), without any legislative power or specific political autonomy which carried out an ambitious program of modernization, but it was disbanded in 1925 by the dictatorship of Primo de Rivera (1923–1930). During the final stage of the Dictatorship, with Spain beginning to suffer an economic crisis, Barcelona hosted the 1929 International Exposition.

After the fall of the dictatorship and a brief proclamation of the Catalan Republic during the events of the proclamation of the Second Spanish Republic (14–17April1931), Catalonia received in 1932 its first Statute of Autonomy from the Spanish Republic's Parliament, granting it a considerable degree of self-government, establishing an autonomous body, the Generalitat of Catalonia, which included a parliament, an executive council and a court of appeal, and the left-wing independentist leader Francesc Macià was appointed its first president. Under the Statute, Catalan became an official language. The governments of the Republican Generalitat, led by the Republican Left of Catalonia (ERC) members Francesc Macià (1931–1933) and Lluís Companys (1933–1940), sought to implement an advanced and progressive social agenda, despite the internal difficulties. This period was marked by political unrest, the effects of the economic crisis and their social repercussions. The Statute of Autonomy was suspended in 1934, due to the Events of 6 October in Barcelona, as a response to the accession of right-wing Spanish nationalist party CEDA to the government of the Republic, considered close to fascism.
After the electoral victory of the left wing Popular Front in February 1936, the Government of Catalonia was pardoned and the self-government restored.

Spanish Civil War (1936–1939) and Franco's rule (1939–1975) 

The defeat of the military rebellion against the Republican government in Barcelona placed Catalonia firmly in the Republican side of the Spanish Civil War. During the war, there were two rival powers in Catalonia: the de jure power of the Generalitat and the de facto power of the armed popular militias. Violent confrontations between the workers' parties (CNT-FAI and POUM against the PSUC) culminated in the defeat of the first ones in 1937. The situation resolved itself progressively in favor of the Generalitat, but at the same time the Generalitat was partially losing its autonomous power within Republican Spain. In 1938 Franco's troops broke the Republican territory in two, isolating Catalonia from the rest of the Republic. The defeat of the Republican army in the Battle of the Ebro led in 1938 and 1939 to the occupation of Catalonia by Franco's forces.

The defeat of the Spanish Republic in the Spanish Civil War brought to power the dictatorship of Francisco Franco, whose first ten-year rule was particularly violent, autocratic, and repressive both in a political, cultural, social, and economical sense. In Catalonia, any kind of public activities associated with Catalan nationalism, republicanism, anarchism, socialism, liberalism, democracy or communism, including the publication of books on those subjects or simply discussion of them in open meetings, was banned.  Franco's regime banned the use of Catalan in government-run institutions and during public events, and also the Catalan institutions of self-government were abolished. The pro-Republic of Spain president of Catalonia, Lluís Companys, was taken to Spain from his exile in the German-occupied France, and was tortured and executed in the Montjuïc Castle of Barcelona for the crime of 'military rebellion'.

During later stages of Francoist Spain, certain folkloric and religious celebrations in Catalan resumed and were tolerated. Use of Catalan in the mass media had been forbidden, but was permitted from the early 1950s in the theatre. Despite the ban during the first years and the difficulties of the next period, publishing in Catalan continued throughout his rule.

The years after the war were extremely hard. Catalonia, like many other parts of Spain, had been devastated by the war. Recovery from the war damage was slow and made more difficult by the international trade embargo and the autarkic politics of Franco's regime. By the late 1950s, the region had recovered its pre-war economic levels and in the 1960s was the second-fastest growing economy in the world in what became known as the Spanish miracle. During this period there was a spectacular growth of industry and tourism in Catalonia that drew large numbers of workers to the region from across Spain and made the area around Barcelona one of Europe's largest industrial metropolitan areas.

Transition and democratic period (1975–present) 

After Franco's death in 1975, Catalonia voted for the adoption of a democratic Spanish Constitution in 1978, in which Catalonia recovered political and cultural autonomy, restoring the Generalitat (exiled since the end of the Civil War in 1939) in 1977 and adopting a new Statute of Autonomy in 1979, which defined Catalonia as a "nationality". The first elections to the Parliament of Catalonia under this Statute gave the Catalan presidency to Jordi Pujol, leader of Convergència i Unió (CiU), a center-right Catalan nationalist electoral coalition, with Pujol re-elected until 2003. Throughout the 1980s and 1990s, the institutions of Catalan autonomy were deployed, among them an autonomous police force, the Mossos d'Esquadra, in 1983, and the broadcasting network Televisió de Catalunya and its first channel TV3, created in 1983. An extensive program of normalization of Catalan language was carried out. Today, Catalonia remains one of the most economically dynamic communities of Spain. The Catalan capital and largest city, Barcelona, is a major international cultural centre and a major tourist destination. In 1992, Barcelona hosted the Summer Olympic Games.

In November 2003, elections to the Parliament of Catalonia gave the government to a left-wing Catalanist coalition formed by the Socialists' Party of Catalonia (PSC-PSOE), Republican Left of Catalonia (ERC) and Initiative for Catalonia Greens (ICV), and the socialist Pasqual Maragall was appointed president. The new government redacted a new version of the Statute of Autonomy, with the aim of consolidate and expand certain aspects of self-government.

The new Statute of Autonomy of Catalonia, approved after a referendum in 2006, was contested by important sectors of the Spanish society, especially by the conservative People's Party, which sent the law to the Constitutional Court of Spain. In 2010, the Court declared non-valid some of the articles that established an autonomous Catalan system of Justice, improved aspects of the financing, a new territorial division, the status of Catalan language or the symbolical declaration of Catalonia as a nation. This decision was severely contested by large sectors of Catalan society, which increased the demands of independence.

Independence movement 

A controversial independence referendum was held in Catalonia on 1 October 2017, using a disputed voting process. It was declared illegal and suspended by the Constitutional Court of Spain, because it breached the 1978 Constitution. Subsequent developments saw, on 27 October 2017, a symbolic declaration of independence by the Parliament of Catalonia, the enforcement of direct rule by the Spanish government through the use of Article 155 of the Constitution, the dismissal of the Executive Council and the dissolution of the Parliament, with a snap regional election called for 21 December 2017, which ended with a victory of pro-independence parties. Former President Carles Puigdemont and five former cabinet ministers fled Spain and took refuge in other European countries (such as Belgium, in Puigdemont's case), whereas nine other cabinet members, including vice-president Oriol Junqueras, were sentenced to prison under various charges of rebellion, sedition, and misuse of public funds. Quim Torra became the 131st President of the Government of Catalonia on 17 May 2018, after the Spanish courts blocked three other candidates.

In 2018, the Assemblea Nacional Catalana joined the Unrepresented Nations and Peoples Organization (UNPO) on behalf of Catalonia.

On 14 October 2019, the Spanish Supreme court sentenced several Catalan political leaders, involved in organizing a referendum on Catalonia's independence from Spain, and convicted them on charges ranging from sedition to misuse of public funds, with sentences ranging from 9 to 13 years in prison. This decision sparked demonstrations around Catalonia. They were later pardoned by the Spanish government and left prison in June 2021.

Geography

Climate 

The climate of Catalonia is diverse. The populated areas lying by the coast in Tarragona, Barcelona and Girona provinces feature a Hot-summer Mediterranean climate (Köppen Csa). The inland part (including the Lleida province and the inner part of Barcelona province) show a mostly Mediterranean climate (Köppen Csa). The Pyrenean peaks have a continental (Köppen D) or even Alpine climate (Köppen ET) at the highest summits, while the valleys have a maritime or oceanic climate sub-type (Köppen Cfb).

Winter is cool or slightly cold depending on the location. It snows frequently in the Pyrenees, and it occasionally snows at lower altitudes, even by the coastline. Spring and autumn are typically the rainiest seasons, except for the Pyrenean valleys, where summer is typically stormy.

The inland part of Catalonia is hotter and drier in summer. Temperature may reach , some days even . Fog is not uncommon in valleys and plains; it can be especially persistent, with freezing drizzle episodes and subzero temperatures during winter, mainly along the Ebro and Segre valleys and in Plain of Vic.

Topography 

Catalonia has a marked geographical diversity, considering the relatively small size of its territory. Catalonia is divided into three main geomorphological units:

The Pyrenees: mountainous formation that connects the Iberian Peninsula with the European continental territory (see passage above);
The Catalan Coastal mountain ranges or the Catalan Mediterranean System: an alternating delevacions and planes parallel to the Mediterranean coast;
The Catalan Central Depression: structural unit which forms the eastern sector of the Valley of the Ebro.

Traditionally differentiated the Axial Pyrenees (the main part) and the Pre-Pyrenees (southern from the Axial) which are mountainous formations parallel to the main mountain ranges but with lower altitudes, less steep and a different geological formation. The highest mountain of Catalonia, located north of the comarca of Pallars Sobirà is the Pica d'Estats (3,143 m), followed by the Puigpedrós (2,914 m). The Serra del Cadí comprises the highest peaks in the Pre-Pyrenees and forms the southern boundary of the Cerdanya valley.

The Central Catalan Depression is a plain located between the Pyrenees and Pre-Coastal Mountains. The plains and the water that descend from the Pyrenees have made it fertile territory for agriculture and numerous irrigation canals have been built. Another major plain is the Empordà, located in the northeast.

The Catalan Mediterranean system is based on two ranges running roughly parallel to the coast (southwest–northeast), called the Coastal and the Pre-Coastal Ranges. The Coastal Range is both the shorter and the lower of the two, while the Pre-Coastal is greater in both length and elevation. Areas within the Pre-Coastal Range include Montserrat, Montseny and the Ports de Tortosa-Beseit. Lowlands alternate with the Coastal and Pre-Coastal Ranges. The Coastal Lowland is located to the East of the Coastal Range between it and the coast, while the Pre-Coastal Lowlands are located inland, between the Coastal and Pre-Coastal Ranges, and includes the Vallès and Penedès plains.

Flora and fauna 

Catalonia is a showcase of European landscapes on a small scale. Just over  hosting a variety of substrates, soils, climates, directions, altitudes and distances to the sea. The area is of great ecological diversity and a remarkable wealth of landscapes, habitats and species.

The fauna of Catalonia comprises a minority of animals endemic to the region and a majority of non-native animals. Much of Catalonia enjoys a Mediterranean climate (except mountain areas), which makes many of the animals that live there adapted to Mediterranean ecosystems. Of mammals, there are plentiful wild boar, red foxes, as well as roe deer and in the Pyrenees, the Pyrenean chamois. Other large species such as the bear have been recently reintroduced.

The waters of the Balearic Sea are rich in biodiversity, and even the megafaunas of the oceans; various types of whales (such as fin, sperm, and pilot) and dolphins can be found in the area.

Hydrography 

Most of Catalonia belongs to the Mediterranean Basin. The Catalan hydrographic network consists of two important basins, the one of the Ebro and the one that comprises the internal basins of Catalonia (respectively covering 46.84% and 51.43% of the territory), all of them flow to the Mediterranean. Furthermore, there is the Garona river basin that flows to the Atlantic Ocean, but it only covers 1.73% of the Catalan territory.

The hydrographic network can be divided in two sectors, an occidental slope or Ebro river slope and one oriental slope constituted by minor rivers that flow to the Mediterranean along the Catalan coast. The difference is due to the big contribution of the Ebro river, from which the Segre is an important tributary. Moreover, in Catalonia there is a relative wealth of groundwaters, although there is inequality between comarques, given the complex geological structure of the territory. In the Pyrenees there are many small lakes, remnants of the ice age. The biggest are the lake of Banyoles and the recently recovered lake of Ivars.

The Catalan Coastal Range hugs the coastline, and it is split into two segments, one between L'Estartit and the town of Blanes (the Costa Brava), and the other at the south, at the Costes del Garraf.

The principal rivers in Catalonia are the Ter, Llobregat, and the Ebro, all of which run into the Mediterranean.

Anthropic pressure and protection of nature
The majority of Catalan population is concentrated in 30% of the territory, mainly in the coastal plains. Intensive agriculture, livestock farming and industrial activities have been accompanied by a massive tourist influx (more than 20 million annual visitors), a rate of urbanization and even of major metropolisation which has led to a strong urban sprawl: two thirds of Catalans live in the urban area of Barcelona, while the proportion of urban land increased from 4.2% in 1993 to 6.2% in 2009, a growth of 48.6% in sixteen years, complemented with a dense network of transport infrastructure. This is accompanied by a certain agricultural abandonment (decrease of 15% of all areas cultivated in Catalonia between 1993 and 2009) and a global threat to natural environment. Human activities have also put some animal species at risk, or even led to their disappearance from the territory, like the gray wolf and probably the brown bear of the Pyrenees. The pressure created by this model of life means that the country's ecological footprint exceeds its administrative area.

Faced with these problems, Catalan authorities initiated several measures whose purpose is to protect natural ecosystems. Thus, in 1990, the Catalan government created the Nature Conservation Council, an advisory body with the aim to study, protect and manage the natural environments and landscapes of Catalonia. In addition, the Generalitat has carried out the Plan of Spaces of Natural Interest ( or PEIN) in 1992 while eighteen Natural Spaces of Special Protection ( or ENPE) have been instituted.

There's a National Park, Aigüestortes i Estany de Sant Maurici; fourteen Natural Parks, Alt Pirineu, Aiguamolls de l'Empordà, Cadí-Moixeró, Cap de Creus, Sources of Ter and Freser, Collserola, Ebro Delta, Ports, Montgrí, Medes Islands and Baix Ter, Montseny, Montserrat, Sant Llorenç del Munt and l'Obac, Serra de Montsant and the Garrotxa Volcanic Zone; as well as three Natural Places of National Interest ( or PNIN), the Pedraforca, the Poblet Forest and the Albères.

Politics 

After Franco's death in 1975 and the adoption of a democratic constitution in Spain in 1978, Catalonia recovered and extended the powers that it had gained in the Statute of Autonomy of 1932 but lost with the fall of the Second Spanish Republic at the end of the Spanish Civil War in 1939.

This autonomous community has gradually achieved more autonomy since the approval of the Spanish Constitution of 1978. The Generalitat holds exclusive jurisdiction in education, health, culture, environment, communications, transportation, commerce, public safety and local government, and only shares jurisdiction with the Spanish government in justice. In all, some analysts argue that formally the current system grants Catalonia with "more self-government than almost any other corner in Europe".

The support for Catalan nationalism ranges from a demand for further autonomy and the federalisation of Spain to the desire for independence from the rest of Spain, expressed by Catalan independentists. The first survey following the Constitutional Court ruling that cut back elements of the 2006 Statute of Autonomy, published by La Vanguardia on 18July2010, found that 46% of the voters would support independence in a referendum. In February of the same year, a poll by the Open University of Catalonia gave more or less the same results. Other polls have shown lower support for independence, ranging from 40 to 49%. Although it is established in the whole of the territory, support for independence is significantly higher in the hinterland and the northeast, away from the more populated coastal areas such as Barcelona.

Since 2011 when the question started to be regularly surveyed by the governmental Center for Public Opinion Studies (CEO), support for Catalan independence has been on the rise. According to the CEO opinion poll from July2016, 47.7% of Catalans would vote for independence and 42.4% against it while, about the question of preferences, according to the CEO opinion poll from March 2016, a 57.2 claim to be "absolutely" or "fairly" in favour of independence. Other polls have shown lower support for independence, ranging from 40 to 49%. Other polls show more variable results, according with the Spanish CIS, as of December2016, 47% of Catalans rejected independence and 45% supported it.

In hundreds of non-binding local referendums on independence, organised across Catalonia from 13September2009, a large majority voted for independence, although critics argued that the polls were mostly held in pro-independence areas. In December2009, 94% of those voting backed independence from Spain, on a turn-out of 25%. The final local referendum was held in Barcelona, in April2011. On 11September2012, a pro-independence march pulled in a crowd of between 600,000 (according to the Spanish Government), 1.5 million (according to the Guàrdia Urbana de Barcelona), and 2 million (according to its promoters); whereas poll results revealed that half the population of Catalonia supported secession from Spain.

Two major factors were Spain's Constitutional Court's 2010 decision to declare part of the 2006 Statute of Autonomy of Catalonia unconstitutional, as well as the fact that Catalonia contributes 19.49% of the central government's tax revenue, but only receives 14.03% of central government's spending.

Parties that consider themselves either Catalan nationalist or independentist have been present in all Catalan governments since 1980. The largest Catalan nationalist party, Convergence and Union, ruled Catalonia from 1980 to 2003, and returned to power in the 2010 election. Between 2003 and 2010, a leftist coalition, composed by the Catalan Socialists' Party, the pro-independence Republican Left of Catalonia and the leftist-environmentalist Initiative for Catalonia-Greens, implemented policies that widened Catalan autonomy.

In the 25 November 2012 Catalan parliamentary election, sovereigntist parties supporting a secession referendum gathered 59.01% of the votes and held 87 of the 135seats in the Catalan Parliament. Parties supporting independence from the rest of Spain obtained 49.12% of the votes and a majority of 74seats.

Artur Mas, then the president of Catalonia, organised early elections that took place on 27September2015. In these elections, Convergència and Esquerra Republicana decided to join, and they presented themselves under the coalition named Junts pel Sí (in Catalan, Together for Yes). Junts pel Sí won 62seats and was the most voted party, and CUP (Candidatura d'Unitat Popular, a far-left and independentist party) won another 10, so the sum of all the independentist forces/parties was 72seats, reaching an absolute majority, but not in number of individual votes, comprising 47,74% of the total.

Statute of Autonomy 

The Statute of Autonomy of Catalonia is the fundamental organic law, second only to the Spanish Constitution from which the Statute originates.

In the Spanish Constitution of 1978 Catalonia, along with the Basque Country and Galicia, was defined as a "nationality". The same constitution gave Catalonia the automatic right to autonomy, which resulted in the Statute of Autonomy of Catalonia of 1979.

Both the 1979 Statute of Autonomy and the current one, approved in 2006, state that "Catalonia, as a nationality, exercises its self-government constituted as an Autonomous Community in accordance with the Constitution and with the Statute of Autonomy of Catalonia, which is its basic institutional law, always under the law in Spain".

The Preamble of the 2006 Statute of Autonomy of Catalonia states that the Parliament of Catalonia has defined Catalonia as a nation, but that "the Spanish Constitution recognizes Catalonia's national reality as a nationality". While the Statute was approved by and sanctioned by both the Catalan and Spanish parliaments, and later by referendum in Catalonia, it has been subject to a legal challenge by the surrounding autonomous communities of Aragon, Balearic Islands and Valencia, as well as by the conservative People's Party. The objections are based on various issues such as disputed cultural heritage but, especially, on the Statute's alleged breaches of the principle of "solidarity between regions" in fiscal and educational matters enshrined by the Constitution.

Spain's Constitutional Court assessed the disputed articles and on 28 June 2010, issued its judgment on the principal allegation of unconstitutionality presented by the People's Party in 2006. The judgment granted clear passage to 182 articles of the 223 that make up the fundamental text. The court approved 73 of the 114 articles that the People's Party had contested, while declaring 14 articles unconstitutional in whole or in part and imposing a restrictive interpretation on 27 others. The court accepted the specific provision that described Catalonia as a "nation", however ruled that it was a historical and cultural term with no legal weight, and that Spain remained the only nation recognised by the constitution.

Government and law 

The Catalan Statute of Autonomy establishes that Catalonia, as an autonomous community, is organised politically through the Generalitat of Catalonia, conformed by the Parliament, the Presidency of the Generalitat, the Government or Executive Council and the other institutions established by the Parliament, among them the Ombudsman, the Office of Auditors the Council for Statutory Guarantees or the Audiovisual Council of Catalonia.

The Parliament of Catalonia is the unicameral legislative body of the Generalitat and represents the people of Catalonia. Its 135members (diputats) are elected by universal suffrage to serve for a four-year period. According to the Statute of Autonomy, it has powers to legislate over devolved matters such as education, health, culture, internal institutional and territorial organization, nomination of the President of the Generalitat and control the Government, budget and other affairs. The last Catalan election was held on 14 February 2021, and its current speaker (president) is Laura Borràs, incumbent since 12March2018.

The President of the Generalitat of Catalonia is the highest representative of Catalonia, and is also responsible of leading the government's action, presiding the Executive Council. Since the restoration of the Generalitat on the return of democracy in Spain, the Presidents of Catalonia have been Josep Tarradellas (1977–1980, president in exile since 1954), Jordi Pujol (1980–2003), Pasqual Maragall (2003–2006), José Montilla (2006–2010), Artur Mas (2010–2016), Carles Puigdemont (2016–2017) and, after the imposition of direct rule from Madrid, Quim Torra (2018–2020) and Pere Aragonès (2021–).

The Executive Council or Government, is the body responsible of the government of the Generalitat, it holds executive and regulatory power, being accountable to the Catalan Parliament. It comprises the President of the Generalitat, the First Minister or the Vice President, and the ministers appointed by the president. Its seat is the Palau de la Generalitat, Barcelona. In 2021 the government was a coalition of two parties, the Republican Left of Catalonia (ERC) and Together for Catalonia (Junts) and is made up of 14 ministers, including the vice President, alongside to the president and a secretary of government, but in October2022 Together for Catalonia (Junts) left the coalition and the government.

Security forces and Justice 

Since 1980 they have been under the command of the Generalitat, and since 1994 they have expanded in number in order to replace the national Civil Guard and National Police Corps, which report directly to the Homeland Department of Spain. The national bodies retain personnel within Catalonia to exercise functions of national scope such as overseeing ports, airports, coasts, international borders, custom offices, the identification of documents and arms control, immigration control, terrorism prevention, arms trafficking prevention, amongst others.

Most of the justice system is administered by national judicial institutions, the highest body and last judicial instance in the Catalan jurisdiction, integrating the Spanish judiciary, is the High Court of Justice of Catalonia. The criminal justice system is uniform throughout Spain, while civil law is administered separately within Catalonia. The civil laws that are subject to autonomous legislation have been codified in the Civil Code of Catalonia since 2002.

Catalonia, together with Navarre and the Basque Country, are the Spanish communities with the highest degree of autonomy in terms of law enforcement.

Administrative divisions 

Catalonia is organised territorially into provinces, further subdivided into comarques and municipalities. The 2006Statute of Autonomy of Catalonia establishes the administrative organisation of three local authorities: vegueries, comarques, and municipalities.

Provinces 

Catalonia is divided administratively into four provinces, the governing body of which is the Provincial Deputation. The four provinces and their populations are:

Province of Barcelona: 5,701,708 population
Province of Girona: 777,258 population
Province of Lleida: 437,939 population
Province of Tarragona: 830,804 population

Comarques 

Comarques (singular: "comarca") are entities composed by the municipalities to manage their responsibilities and services. The current regional division has its roots in a decree of the Generalitat de Catalunya of 1936, in effect until 1939, when it was suppressed by Franco. In 1987 the Catalan Government reestablished the comarcal division and in 1988 three new comarques were added (Alta Ribagorça, Pla d'Urgell and Pla de l'Estany). In 2015 was created an additional comarca, the Moianès. At present there are 41, excluding Aran. Every comarca is administered by a comarcal council.

Since 2015 it is defined as "unique territorial entity", while the powers of the Conselh Generau were expanded.

Municipalities 

There are at present 947municipalities in Catalonia. Each municipality is run by a council elected every four years by the residents in local elections. The council consists of a number of members depending on population, who elect the mayor ( or ). Its seat is the town hall (or ).

Vegueries 

The vegueria is a proposed type of division defined as a specific territorial area for the exercise of government and inter-local cooperation with legal personality. The current Statute of Autonomy states vegueries are intended to supersede provinces in Catalonia, and take over many of functions of the comarques.

The territorial plan of Catalonia provided six general functional areas, but was amended by Law24/2001, of 31December, recognizing the Alt Pirineu i Aran as a new functional area differentiated of Ponent. On 14July2010 the Catalan Parliament approved the creation of the functional area of the Penedès.

Alt Pirineu i Aran: Alta Ribagorça, Alt Urgell, Cerdanya, Pallars Jussà, Pallars Sobirà and Val d'Aran.
Àmbit Metropolità de Barcelona: Baix Llobregat, Barcelonès, Garraf, Maresme, Vallès Oriental and Vallès Occidental.
Camp de Tarragona: Tarragonès, Alt Camp, Baix Camp, Conca de Barberà and Priorat.
Comarques gironines: Alt Empordà, Baix Empordà, Garrotxa, Gironès, Pla de l'Estany, La Selva and Ripollès.
Comarques centrals: Anoia (8 municipalities of 33), Bages, Berguedà, Osona and Solsonès.
Penedès: Alt Penedès, Baix Penedès, Anoia (25 municipalities of 33) and Garraf.
Ponent: Garrigues, Noguera, Segarra, Segrià, Pla d'Urgell and Urgell.
Terres de l'Ebre: Baix Ebre, Montsià, Ribera d'Ebre and Terra Alta.

Economy 

A highly industrialized region, the nominal GDP of Catalonia in 2018 was €228 billion (second after the community of Madrid, €230 billion) and the per capitaGDP was €30,426 ($32,888), behind Madrid (€35,041), the Basque Country (€33,223), and Navarre (€31,389). That year, the GDP growth was 2.3%. In recent years, and increasingly following the unilateral declaration of independence in 2017, there has been a negative net relocation rate of companies based in Catalonia moving to other autonomous communities of Spain. From the 2017 independence referendum until the end of 2018, for example, Catalonia lost 5454companies to other parts of Spain (mainly Madrid), 2359 only in 2018, gaining 467 new ones from the rest of the country during 2018.

Catalonia's long-term credit rating is BB(Non-Investment Grade) according to Standard & Poor's, Ba2(Non-Investment Grade) according to Moody's, and BBB-(Low Investment Grade) according to Fitch Ratings. Catalonia's rating is tied for worst with between 1 and 5 other autonomous communities of Spain, depending on the rating agency.

The city of Barcelona occupies the eighth position as one of the world's best  cities to live, work, research and visit in 2021, according to the report "The World's Best Cities 2021", prepared by Resonance Consultancy.

The Catalan capital, despite the current moment of crisis, is also one of the European bases of "reference for start-ups" and the fifth city in the world to establish one of these companies, behind London, Berlin, Paris and Amsterdam, according to the Eu-Starts-Up 2020 study. Barcelona is behind London, New York, Paris, Moscow, Tokyo, Dubai and Singapore and ahead of Los Angeles and Madrid.

In the context of the financial crisis of 2007–2008, Catalonia was expected to suffer a recession amounting to almost a 2% contraction of its regional GDP in 2009. Catalonia's debt in 2012 was the highest of all Spain's autonomous communities, reaching €13,476 million, i.e. 38% of the total debt of the 17autonomous communities, but in recent years its economy recovered a positive evolution and the GDP grew a 3.3% in 2015.

Catalonia is amongst the List of country subdivisions by GDP over 100billionUSdollars and is a member of the Four Motors for Europe organisation.

The distribution of sectors is as follows:

Primary sector: 3%. The amount of land devoted to agricultural use is 33%.
Secondary sector: 37% (compared to Spain's 29%)
Tertiary sector: 60% (compared to Spain's 67%)

The main tourist destinations in Catalonia are the city of Barcelona, the beaches of the Costa Brava in Girona, the beaches of the Costa del Maresme and Costa del Garraf from Malgrat de Mar to Vilanova i la Geltrú and the Costa Daurada in Tarragona. In the High Pyrenees there are several ski resorts, near Lleida. On 1November2012, Catalonia started charging a tourist tax. The revenue is used to promote tourism, and to maintain and upgrade tourism-related infrastructure.

Many savings banks were based in Catalonia before the independence referendum of 2017, with 10 of the 46 Spanish savings banks having headquarters in the region at that time. This list included Europe's premier savings bank, La Caixa, which, on 7October2017, a week after the referendum, moved its headquarters to Palma de Mallorca, in the Balearic Islands and CaixaBank to Valencia, in the Valencian Community. The first private bank in Catalonia, Banc Sabadell, ranked fourth among all Spanish private banks, also moved its headquarters to Alicante, in the Valencian Community.

The stock market of Barcelona, which in 2016 had a volume of around €152 billion, is the second largest of Spain after Madrid, and Fira de Barcelona organizes international exhibitions and congresses to do with different sectors of the economy.

The main economic cost for Catalan families is the purchase of a home. According to data from the Society of Appraisal on 31December2005 Catalonia is, after Madrid, the second most expensive region in Spain for housing: 3,397 €/m2 on average (see Spanish property bubble).

Unemployment 
The unemployment rate stood at 10.5% in 2019 and was lower than the national average.

Transport

Airports 

Airports in Catalonia are owned and operated by Aena (a Spanish Government entity) except two airports in Lleida which are operated by Aeroports de Catalunya (an entity belonging to the Government of Catalonia).

Barcelona El Prat Airport (Aena)
Girona-Costa Brava Airport (Aena)
Reus Airport (Aena)
Lleida-Alguaire Airport (Aeroports de Catalunya)
Sabadell Airport (Aena)
La Seu d'Urgell Airport (Aeroports de Catalunya)

Ports 

Since the Middle Ages, Catalonia has been well integrated into international maritime networks. With 1,950,000TEUs in 2015, it is the first container port in Catalonia, the third in Spain after Valencia and Algeciras in Andalusia, the 9thin the Mediterranean Sea, the 14thin Europe and the 68thin the world. It is sixth largest cruise port in the world, the first in Europe and the Mediterranean with 2,364,292passengers in 2014. The ports of Tarragona (owned and operated by Puertos del Estado) in the southwest and Palamós near Girona at northeast are much more modest.

The development of these infrastructures, resulting from the topography and history of the Catalan territory, responds strongly to the administrative and political organization of this autonomous community.

Roads 

The principal highways are  AP-7  and  A-7 . They follow the coast from the French border to Valencia, Murcia and Andalusia. The main roads generally radiate from Barcelona. The  AP-2   and  A-2  connect inland and onward to Madrid.

Other major roads are:

Public-own roads in Catalonia are either managed by the autonomous government of Catalonia (e.g.,  C-  roads) or the Spanish government (e.g.,  AP- ,  A- ,  N-  roads).

Railways 

Catalonia saw the first railway construction in the Iberian Peninsula in 1848, linking Barcelona with Mataró. Given the topography, most lines radiate from Barcelona. The city has both suburban and inter-city services. The main east coast line runs through the province connecting with the SNCF (French Railways) at Portbou on the coast.

There are two publicly owned railway companies operating in Catalonia: the Catalan FGC that operates commuter and regional services, and the Spanish national Renfe that operates long-distance and high-speed rail services (AVE and Avant) and the main commuter and regional service , administered by the Catalan government since 2010.

High-speed rail (AVE) services from Madrid currently reach Barcelona, via Lleida and Tarragona. The official opening between Barcelona and Madrid took place 20February2008. The journey between Barcelona and Madrid now takes about two-and-a-half hours. A connection to the French high-speed TGV network has been completed (called the Perpignan–Barcelona high-speed rail line) and the Spanish AVE service began commercial services on the line 9January2013, later offering services to Marseille on their high speed network. This was shortly followed by the commencement of commercial service by the French TGV on 17January2013, leading to an average travel time on the Paris-Barcelona TGV route of 7h42m. This new line passes through Girona and Figueres with a tunnel through the Pyrenees.

Demographics 

As of 2017, the official population of Catalonia was 7,522,596. 1,194,947residents did not have Spanish citizenship, accounting for about 16% of the population.

The metropolitan area of the Urban Region includes cities such as L'Hospitalet de Llobregat, Sabadell, Terrassa, Badalona, Santa Coloma de Gramenet and Cornellà de Llobregat.

In 1900, the population of Catalonia was 1,966,382people and in 1970 it was 5,122,567. The sizeable increase of the population was due to the demographic boom in Spain during the 1960s and early 1970s as well as in consequence of large-scale internal migration from the rural economically weak regions to its more prospering industrial cities. In Catalonia, that wave of internal migration arrived from several regions of Spain, especially from Andalusia, Murcia and Extremadura. As of 1999, it was estimated that over 60% of Catalans descended from 20thcentury migrations from other parts of Spain.

Immigrants from other countries settled in Catalonia since the 1990s; a large percentage comes from Africa, Latin America and Eastern Europe, and smaller numbers from Asia and Southern Europe, often settling in urban centers such as Barcelona and industrial areas. In 2017, Catalonia had 940,497foreign residents (11.9%of the total population) with non-Spanish ID cards, without including those who acquired Spanish citizenship.

Religion 

Historically, all the Catalan population was Christian, specifically Catholic, but since the 1980s there has been a trend of decline of Christianity. Nevertheless, according to the most recent study sponsored by the Government of Catalonia, as of 2020, 62.3% of the Catalans identify as Christians (up from 61.9% in 2016 and 56.5% in 2014) of whom 53.0%Catholics, 7.0%Protestants and Evangelicals, 1.3%Orthodox Christians and 1.0%Jehovah's Witnesses. At the same time, 18.6% of the population identify as atheists, 8.8%as agnostics, 4.3%as Muslims, and a further 3.4% as being of other religions.

Languages 

According to the linguistic census held by the Government of Catalonia in 2013, Spanish is the most spoken language in Catalonia (46.53%claim Spanish as "their own language"), followed by Catalan (37.26%claim Catalan as "their own language"). In everyday use, 11.95%of the population claim to use both languages equally, whereas 45.92%mainly use Spanish and 35.54%mainly use Catalan. There is a significant difference between the Barcelona metropolitan area (and, to a lesser extent, the Tarragona area), where Spanish is more spoken than Catalan, and the more rural and small town areas, where Catalan clearly prevails over Spanish.

Originating in the historic territory of Catalonia, Catalan has enjoyed special status since the approval of the Statute of Autonomy of 1979 which declares it to be "Catalonia's own language", a term which signifies a language given special legal status within a Spanish territory, or which is historically spoken within a given region. The other languages with official status in Catalonia are Spanish, which has official status throughout Spain, and Aranese Occitan, which is spoken in Val d'Aran.

Since the Statute of Autonomy of 1979, Aranese (a Gascon dialect of Occitan) has also been official and subject to special protection in Val d'Aran. This small area of 7,000inhabitants was the only place where a dialect of Occitan had received full official status. Then, on 9August2006, when the new Statute came into force, Occitan became official throughout Catalonia. Occitan is the mother tongue of 22.4% of the population of Val d'Aran, which has attracted heavy immigration from other Spanish regions to work in the service industry. Catalan Sign Language is also officially recognised.

Although not considered an "official language" in the same way as Catalan, Spanish, and Occitan, the Catalan Sign Language, with about 18,000 users in Catalonia, is granted official recognition and support: "The public authorities shall guarantee the use of Catalan sign language and conditions of equality for deaf people who choose to use this language, which shall be the subject of education, protection and respect."

As was the case since the ascent of the Bourbon dynasty to the throne of Spain after the War of the Spanish Succession, and with the exception of the short period of the Second Spanish Republic, under Francoist Spain Catalan was banned from schools and all other official use, so that for example families were not allowed to officially register children with Catalan names. Although never completely banned, Catalan language publishing was severely restricted during the early 1940s, with only religious texts and small-run self-published texts being released. Some books were published clandestinely or circumvented the restrictions by showing publishing dates prior to 1936. This policy was changed in 1946, when restricted publishing in Catalan resumed.

Rural–urban migration originating in other parts of Spain also reduced the social use of Catalan in urban areas and increased the use of Spanish. Lately, a similar sociolinguistic phenomenon has occurred with foreign immigration. Catalan cultural activity increased in the 1960s and the teaching of Catalan began thanks to the initiative of associations such as Òmnium Cultural.

After the end of Francoist Spain, the newly established self-governing democratic institutions in Catalonia embarked on a long-term language policy to recover the use of Catalan and has, since 1983, enforced laws which attempt to protect and extend the use of Catalan. This policy, known as the "linguistic normalisation" ( in Catalan,  in Spanish) has been supported by the vast majority of Catalan political parties through the last thirty years. Some groups consider these efforts a way to discourage the use of Spanish, whereas some others, including the Catalan government and the European Union consider the policies respectful, or even as an example which "should be disseminated throughout the Union".

Today, Catalan is the main language of the Catalan autonomous government and the other public institutions that fall under its jurisdiction. Basic public education is given mainly in Catalan, but also there are some hours per week of Spanish medium instruction. Although businesses are required by law to display all information (e.g. menus, posters) at least in Catalan, this not systematically enforced. There is no obligation to display this information in either Occitan or Spanish, although there is no restriction on doing so in these or other languages. The use of fines was introduced in a 1997 linguistic law that aims to increase the public use of Catalan and defend the rights of Catalan speakers. On the other hand, the Spanish Constitution does not recognize equal language rights for national minorities since it enshrined Spanish as the only official language of the state, the knowledge of which being compulsory. Numerous laws regarding for instance the labelling of pharmaceutical products, make in effect Spanish the only language of compulsory use.

The law ensures that both Catalan and Spanish – being official languages – can be used by the citizens without prejudice in all public and private activities. The Generalitat uses Catalan in its communications and notifications addressed to the general population, but citizens can also receive information from the Generalitat in Spanish if they so wish. Debates in the Catalan Parliament take place almost exclusively in Catalan and the Catalan public television broadcasts programs mainly in Catalan.

Due to the intense immigration which Spain in general and Catalonia in particular experienced in the first decade of the 21st century, many foreign languages are spoken in various cultural communities in Catalonia, of which Rif-Berber, Moroccan Arabic, Romanian and Urdu are the most common ones.

In Catalonia, there is a high social and political consensus on the language policies favoring Catalan, also among Spanish speakers and speakers of other languages. However, some of these policies have been criticised for trying to promote Catalan by imposing fines on businesses. For example, following the passage of the law on Catalan cinema in March 2010, which established that half of the movies shown in Catalan cinemas had to be in Catalan, a general strike of 75% of the cinemas took place. The Catalan government gave in and dropped the clause that forced 50% of the movies to be dubbed or subtitled in Catalan before the law came to effect. On the other hand, organisations such as Plataforma per la Llengua reported different violations of the linguistic rights of the Catalan speakers in Catalonia and the other Catalan-speaking territories in Spain, most of them caused by the institutions of the Spanish government in these territories.

The Catalan language policy has been challenged by some political parties in the Catalan Parliament. Citizens, currently the main opposition party, has been one of the most consistent critics of the Catalan language policy within Catalonia. The Catalan branch of the People's Party has a more ambiguous position on the issue: on one hand, it demands a bilingual Catalan–Spanish education and a more balanced language policy that would defend Catalan without favoring it over Spanish, whereas on the other hand, a few local PP politicians have supported in their municipalities measures privileging Catalan over Spanish and it has defended some aspects of the official language policies, sometimes against the positions of its colleagues from other parts of Spain.

Culture

Art and architecture 

Catalonia has given to the world many important figures in the area of the art. Catalan painters internationally known are, among others, Salvador Dalí, Joan Miró and Antoni Tàpies. Closely linked with the Catalan pictorial atmosphere, Pablo Picasso lived in Barcelona during his youth, training them as an artist and creating the movement of cubism. Other important artists are Claudi Lorenzale for the medieval Romanticism that marked the artistic Renaixença, Marià Fortuny for the Romanticism and Catalan Orientalism of the nineteenth century, Ramon Casas or Santiago Rusiñol, main representatives of the pictorial current of Catalan modernism from the end of the nineteenth century to the beginning of the twentieth century, Josep Maria Sert for early 20th-century Noucentisme, or Josep Maria Subirachs for expressionist or abstract sculpture and painting of the late twentieth century.

The most important painting museums of Catalonia are the Teatre-Museu Dalí in Figueres, the National Art Museum of Catalonia (MNAC), Picasso Museum, Fundació Antoni Tàpies, Joan Miró Foundation, the Barcelona Museum of Contemporary Art (MACBA), the Centre of Contemporary Culture of Barcelona (CCCB) and the CaixaForum.

In the field of architecture were developed and adapted to Catalonia different artistic styles prevalent in Europe, leaving footprints in many churches, monasteries and cathedrals, of Romanesque (the best examples of which are located in the northern half of the territory) and Gothic styles. The Gothic developed in Barcelona and its area of influence is known as Catalan Gothic, with some particular characteristics. The church of Santa Maria del Mar is an example of this kind of style. During the Middle Ages, many fortified castles were built by feudal nobles to mark their powers.

There are some examples of Renaissance (such as the Palau de la Generalitat), Baroque and Neoclassical architectures. In the late nineteenth century Modernism (Art Nouveau) appeared as the national art. The world-renowned Catalan architects of this style are Antoni Gaudí, Lluís Domènech i Montaner and Josep Puig i Cadafalch. Thanks to the urban expansion of Barcelona during the last decades of the century and the first ones of the next, many buildings of the Eixample are modernists. In the field of architectural rationalism, which turned especially relevant in Catalonia during the Republican era (1931–1939) highlighting Josep Lluís Sert and Josep Torres i Clavé, members of the GATCPAC and, in contemporany architecture, Ricardo Bofill and Enric Miralles.

Monuments and World Heritage Sites 

There are several UNESCO World Heritage Sites in Catalonia:

Archaeological Ensemble of Tarraco, Tarragona
Catalan Romanesque Churches of the Vall de Boí, Lleida province
Poblet Monastery, Poblet, Tarragona province
Works of Lluís Domènech i Montaner:
Palau de la Música Catalana, Barcelona
Hospital de Sant Pau, Barcelona
Works of Antoni Gaudí:
Sagrada Família, Barcelona
Parc Güell, Barcelona
Palau Güell, Barcelona
Casa Milà (La Pedrera), Barcelona
Casa Vicens, Barcelona
Casa Batlló, Barcelona
The Church of Colònia Güell, Santa Coloma de Cervelló, Barcelona province

Literature 

The oldest surviving literary use of the Catalan language is considered to be the religious text known as Homilies d'Organyà, written either in late 11th or early 12thcentury.

There are two historical moments of splendor of Catalan literature. The first begins with the historiographic chronicles of the 13thcentury (chronicles written between the thirteenth and fourteenth centuries narrating the deeds of the monarchs and leading figures of the Crown of Aragon) and the subsequent Golden Age of the 14th and 15thcenturies.

The second moment of splendor began in the 19thcentury with the cultural and political  (Renaissance) represented by writers and poets such as Jacint Verdaguer, Víctor Català (pseudonym of Caterina Albert i Paradís), Narcís Oller, Joan Maragall and Àngel Guimerà. During the 20thcentury, avant-garde movements developed, initiated by the Generation of '14 (called Noucentisme in Catalonia), represented by Eugeni d'Ors, Joan Salvat-Papasseit, Josep Carner, Carles Riba, J.V. Foix and others. During the dictatorship of Primo de Rivera, the Civil War (Generation of '36) and the Francoist period, Catalan literature was maintained despite the repression against the Catalan language, being often produced in exile.

The most outstanding authors of this period are Salvador Espriu, Josep Pla, Josep Maria de Sagarra (who are considered mainly responsible for the renewal of Catalan prose), Mercè Rodoreda, Joan Oliver Sallarès or "Pere Quart", Pere Calders, Gabriel Ferrater, Manuel de Pedrolo, Agustí Bartra or Miquel Martí i Pol. In addition, several foreign writers who fought in the International Brigades, or other military units, have since recounted their experiences of fighting in their works, historical or fictional, with for example, George Orwell, in Homage to Catalonia (1938) or Claude Simon's Le Palace (1962) and Les Géorgiques (1981).

After the transition to democracy (1975–1978) and the restoration of the Generalitat (1977), literary life and the editorial market have returned to normality and literary production in Catalan is being bolstered with a number of language policies intended to protect Catalan culture. Besides the aforementioned authors, other relevant 20th-century writers of the Francoist and democracy periods include Joan Brossa, Agustí Bartra, Manuel de Pedrolo, Pere Calders or Quim Monzó.

Ana María Matute, Jaime Gil de Biedma, Manuel Vázquez Montalbán and Juan Goytisolo are among the most prominent Catalan writers in the Spanish language since the democratic restoration in Spain.

Festivals and public holidays 

Castells are one of the main manifestations of Catalan popular culture. The activity consists in constructing human towers by competing  (teams). This practice originated in Valls, on the region of the Camp de Tarragona, during the 18th century, and later it was extended along the next two centuries to the rest of the territory. The tradition of els Castells i els Castellers was declared Masterpiece of the Oral and Intangible Heritage of Humanity by UNESCO in 2010.

Christmas in Catalonia lasts two days, plus Christmas Eve. On the 25th, Christmas is celebrated, followed by a similar feast on the 26, called Sant Esteve (Saint Steve's Day). This allows families to visit and dine with different sectors of the extended family, or get together with friends on the second day.

Note that the word has nothing to do with the Spanish word tío, meaning uncle. Tió means log in Catalan. The log is sometimes "found in the woods" (in an event staged for children) and then adopted and taken home, where it is fed and cared for during a month or so. On Christmas Day or on Christmas Eve, a game is played where children march around the house singing a song requesting the log to poop, then they tap the log gently with a stick, as if a magic wand, to make it poop, and lo and behold, as if through magic, it poops candy, and sometimes other small gifts. Usually the larger or main gifts are brought by the Three Kings on 6 January, and the tió only brings small things.

Churches often host exhibits of numerous dioramas by nativity scene makers, or a single nativity scene they put out, and town halls generally put out a nativity scene in the central square. In Barcelona, every year, the main nativity scene is designed by different artists, and often ends up being an interesting, post-modern or conceptual and strange creation. In the home, the nativity scene often consists of strips of cork bark to represent cliffs or mountains in the background, moss as grass in the foreground, some wood chips or other as dirt, and aluminum foil for rivers and lakes. The traditional figurines often included are the three wise men on camels or horses, which are moved every day or so to go closer to the manger, a star with a long tail in the background to lead people to the spot, the annunciation with shepherds having a meal and an angel appearing (hanging from something), a washer lady washing clothes in the pond, sheep, ducks, people carrying packages on their backs, a donkey driver with a load of twigs, and atrezzo such as a starry sky, miniature towns placed in the distance, either Oriental-styled or local-looking, a bridge over the river, trees, etc.

This figurine is hidden in some corner of the nativity scene and the game is to detect it. Of course, churches forgo this figurine, and the main nativity scene of Barcelona, for instance, likewise does not feature it. The caganer is so popular it has, together with the tió, long been a major part of the Christmas markets, where they come in the guise of your favorite politicians or other famous people, as well as the traditional figures of a Catalan farmer. People often buy a figurine of a caganer in the guise of a famous person they are actually fond of, contrary to what one would imagine, though sometimes people buy a caganer in the guise of someone they dislike, although this means they have to look at them in the home.

Another (extended) Christmas tradition is the celebration of the Epiphany on 6 January, which is called Reis, meaning Three Kings Day. This is every important in Catalonia and the Catalan-speaking areas, and families go to watch major parades on the eve of the Epiphany, where they can greet the kings and watch them pass by in pomp and circumstance, on floats and preceded and followed by pages, musicians, dancers, etc. They often give the kings letters with their gift requests, which are collected by the pages. On the next day, the children find the gifts the three kings brought for them.

In addition to traditional local Catalan culture, traditions from other parts of Spain can be found as a result of migration from other regions, for instance the celebration of the Andalusian  in Catalonia.

On 28 July 2010, second only after the Canary Islands, Catalonia became another Spanish territory to forbid bullfighting. The ban, which went into effect on 1 January 2012, had originated in a popular petition supported by over 180,000 signatures.

Music and dance 

The sardana is considered to be the most characteristic Catalan folk dance, interpreted to the rhythm of tamborí, tible and tenora (from the oboe family), trumpet, trombó (trombone), fiscorn (family of bugles) and contrabaix with three strings played by a cobla, and are danced in a circle dance. Other tunes and dances of the traditional music are the contrapàs (obsolete today), ball de bastons (the "dance of sticks"), the moixiganga, the goigs (popular songs), the galops or the jota in the southern part.

Art music was first developed, up to the nineteenth century and, as in much of Europe, in a liturgical setting, particularly marked by the Escolania de Montserrat. The main Western musical trends have marked these productions, medieval monodies or polyphonies, with the work of Abbot Oliba in the eleventh century or the compilation Llibre Vermell de Montserrat ("Red Book of Montserrat") from the fourteenth century. Through the Renaissance there were authors such as Pere Albert Vila, Joan Brudieu or the two Mateu Fletxa ("The Old" and "The Young"). Baroque had composers like Joan Cererols. The Romantic music was represented by composers such as Fernando Sor, Josep Anselm Clavé (father of choir movement in Catalonia and responsible of the music folk reviving) or Felip Pedrell.

Modernisme also expressed in musical terms from the end of the 19th century onwards, mixing folkloric and post-romantic influences, through the works of Isaac Albéniz and Enric Granados. The avant-garde spirit initiated by the modernists is prolonged throughout the twentieth century, thanks to the activities of the Orfeó Català, a choral society founded in 1891, with its monumental concert hall, the Palau de la Música Catalana in Catalan, built by Lluís Domènech i Montaner from 1905 to 1908, the Barcelona Symphony Orchestra created in 1944 and composers, conductors and musicians engaged against the Francoism like Robert Gerhard, Eduard Toldrà and Pau Casals.

Performances of opera, mostly imported from Italy, began in the 18th century, but some native operas were written as well, including the ones by Domènec Terradellas, Carles Baguer, Ramon Carles, Isaac Albéniz and Enric Granados. The Barcelona main opera house, Gran Teatre del Liceu (opened in 1847), remains one of the most important in Spain, hosting one of the most prestigious music schools in Barcelona, the Conservatori Superior de Música del Liceu. Several lyrical artists trained by this institution gained international renown during the 20th century, such as Victoria de los Ángeles, Montserrat Caballé, Giacomo Aragall and Josep Carreras.

Cellist Pau Casals is admired as an outstanding player. Other popular musical styles were born in the second half of the 20th century such as Nova Cançó from the 1960s with Lluís Llach and the group Els Setze Jutges, the Catalan rumba in the 1960s with Peret, Catalan Rock from the late 1970s with La Banda Trapera del Río and Decibelios for Punk Rock, Sau, Els Pets, Sopa de Cabra or Lax'n'Busto for pop rock or Sangtraït for hard rock, electropop since the 1990s with OBK and indie pop from the 1990s.

Media and cinema 

Catalonia is the autonomous community, along with Madrid, that has the most media (TV, magazines, newspapers etc.). In Catalonia there is a wide variety of local and comarcal media. With the restoration of democracy, many newspapers and magazines, until then in the hands of the Franco government, were recovered in order to convert them into free and democratic media, while local radios and televisions were implemented.

Televisió de Catalunya, which broadcasts entirely in the Catalan language, is the main Catalan public TV. It has five channels: TV3, El 33, Super3, 3/24, Esport3 and TV3CAT. In 2018, TV3 became the first television channel to be the most viewed one for nine consecutive years in Catalonia. State televisions that broadcast in Catalonia in Spanish language include Televisión Española (with few emissions in Catalan), Antena 3, Cuatro, Telecinco, and La Sexta.

The two main Catalan newspapers of general information are El Periódico de Catalunya and La Vanguardia, both with editions in Catalan and Spanish. Catalan only published newspapers include Ara and El Punt Avui (from the fusion of El Punt and Avui in 2011), as well as most part of the local press. The Spanish newspapers, such as El País, El Mundo or La Razón, can be also acquired.

Catalonia has a long tradition of use of radio, the first regular radio broadcast in the country was from Ràdio Barcelona in 1924. Today, the public Catalunya Ràdio (owned by Catalan Media Corporation) and the private RAC 1 (belonging to Grup Godó) are the two main radios of Catalonia, both in Catalan.

Regarding the cinema, after the democratic transition, three styles have dominated since then. First, auteur cinema, in the continuity of the Barcelona School, emphasizes experimentation and form, while focusing on developing social and political themes. Worn first by Josep Maria Forn or Bigas Luna, then by Marc Recha, Jaime Rosales and Albert Serra, this genre has achieved some international recognition. Then, the documentary became another genre particularly representative of contemporary Catalan cinema, boosted by Joaquim Jordà i Català and José Luis Guerín. Later, horror films and thrillers have also emerged as a specialty of the Catalan film industry, thanks in particular to the vitality of the Sitges Film Festival, created in 1968. Several directors have gained worldwide renown thanks to this genre, starting with Jaume Balagueró and his series REC (co-directed with Valencian Paco Plaza), Juan Antonio Bayona and El Orfanato or Jaume Collet-Serra with Orphan, Unknown and Non-Stop.

Catalan actors have shot for Spanish and international productions, such as Sergi López.

The Museum of Cinema - Tomàs Mallol Collection (Museu del Cinema – Col.lecció Tomàs Mallol in Catalan) of Girona is home of important permanent exhibitions of cinema and pre-cinema objects. Other important institutions for the promotion of cinema are the Gaudí Awards (Premis Gaudí in Catalan, which replaced from 2009 Barcelona Film Awards themselves created in 2002), serving as equivalent for Catalonia to the Spanish Goya or French César.

Philosophy 

 is a form of ancestral Catalan wisdom or sensibleness. It involves well-pondered perception of situations, level-headedness, awareness, integrity, and right action. Many Catalans consider seny something unique to their culture, is based on a set of ancestral local customs stemming from the scale of values and social norms of their society.

Sport 

Sport has had a distinct importance in Catalan life and culture since the beginning of the 20th century; consequently, the region has a well-developed sports infrastructure. The main sports are football, basketball, handball, rink hockey, tennis and motorsport.

Despite the fact that the most popular sports are represented outside by the Spanish national teams, Catalonia can officially play as itself in some others, like korfball, futsal or rugby league. Most of Catalan Sports Federations have a long tradition and some of them participated in the foundation of international sports federations, as the Catalan Federation of Rugby, that was one of the founder members of the Fédération Internationale de Rugby Amateur (FIRA) in 1934. The majority of Catalan sport federations are part of the Sports Federation Union of Catalonia, founded in 1933.

The Catalan Football Federation also periodically fields a national team against international opposition, organizing friendly matches. In the recent years they have played with Bulgaria, Argentina, Brazil, Basque Country, Colombia, Nigeria, Cape Verde and Tunisia. The biggest football clubs are FC Barcelona (also known as Barça), who have won five European Cups (UEFA Champions League), and RCD Espanyol, who have twice been runner-up of the UEFA Cup. Both play in La Liga.

The Catalan waterpolo is one of the main powers of the Iberian Peninsula. The Catalans won triumphs in waterpolo competitions at European and world level by club (the Barcelona was champion of Europe in 1981/82 and the Catalonia in 1994/95) and national team (one gold and one silver in Olympic Games and World Championships). It also has many international synchronized swimming champions.

Motorsport has a long tradition in Catalonia, which involving many people, with some world champions and several competitions organized since the beginning of the 20th century. The Circuit de Catalunya, built in 1991, is one of the main motorsport venues, holding the Catalan motorcycle Grand Prix, the Spanish F1 Grand Prix, a DTM race, and several other races.

Catalonia hosted many relevant international sport events, such as the 1992 Summer Olympics in Barcelona, and also the 1955 Mediterranean Games, the 2013 World Aquatics Championships or the 2018 Mediterranean Games. It held annually the fourth-oldest still-existing cycling stage race in the world, the Volta a Catalunya (Tour of Catalonia).

Symbols 

Catalonia has its own representative and distinctive national symbols such as:

It has been an official symbol since the Statute of Catalonia of 1932.
The National Day of Catalonia is on 11 September, and it is commonly called . It commemorates the 1714 siege of Barcelona defeat during the War of the Spanish Succession.
The song is official by law from 25 February 1993. It is based on the events of 1639 and 1640 during the Catalan Revolt.
St George's Day is widely celebrated in all the towns of Catalonia on 23 April, and includes an exchange of books and roses between couples or family members.

Cuisine 

Catalan gastronomy has a long culinary tradition. Various local food recipes have been described in documents dating from the fifteenth century. As with all the cuisines of the Mediterranean, Catatonian dishes make abundant use of fish, seafood, olive oil, bread and vegetables. Often the dish is accompanied with any number of sausages (cured botifarres, fuet, iberic ham, etc.), ham or cheeses.

Catalan vineyards also have several  wines, such as: Priorat, Montsant, Penedès and Empordà. There is also a sparkling wine, the cava.

Catalonia is internationally recognized for its fine dining. Three of the World's 50 Best Restaurants are in Catalonia, and four restaurants have three Michelin stars, including restaurants like El Bulli or El Celler de Can Roca, both of which regularly dominate international rankings of restaurants. The region has been awarded the European Region of Gastronomy title for the year 2016.

Twinning and covenants 
 Nuevo León
 California
 Quebec

See also 

Catalan Company
Catalan Countries
Date and time notation in Catalonia
List of European regions by GDP
List of people from Catalonia
Northern Catalonia
Outline of Catalonia

Notes

References

External links 

Generalitat de Catalunya (Government of Catalonia)
Statute of Autonomy of Catalonia

 
Autonomous communities of Spain
Catalan Countries
NUTS 2 statistical regions of the European Union
Regions of Europe with multiple official languages
States and territories established in 1932
States and territories established in 1979